Sálvio Spínola Fagundes Filho (born 14 September 1968 in Urandi, Bahia) is a former Brazilian football referee.

Refereeing career
Sálvio was born in the state of Bahia, but has lived in capital city of São Paulo since the age of 1. He first showed interest in refereeing in 1992, when he signed up for the refereeing course in the Federação Paulista de Futebol. Since then, he has been a São Paulo State referee for Brazilian competitions.

He has been an International FIFA referee since 2005 and took charge of numerous Copa Libertadores and Copa Sudamericana matches since then. He was also selected for the 2007 FIFA U-17 World Cup in South Korea where he officiated six matches including the semifinal between Spain and Ghana. Fagundes also officiated in 2010 and 2014 World Cup qualifiers.

Following the retirement of fellow countryman Carlos Eugênio Simon he finally secured his maiden Copa América appointment in 2011, where he went on to officiate the final between Uruguay and Paraguay.

As of July 2013, Fagundes is no longer listed on the FIFA list for Brazil, because of the FIFA international age limit of 45.

Fagundes is also a lawyer and economist. After his retirement as international referee, he has acted as a pundit for Brazilian channel ESPN Brasil.

Statistics

Série A

References

External links
 WorldReferee.com - Profile

1968 births
Living people
Brazilian football referees
Copa América referees